Jean Rosset (31 October 1937 – 3 December 2021) was a French sculptor.

Biography
Rosset was born into a modest, agricultural family and entered the workforce at age 14. In 1962, he took drawing and painting classes and was introduced to the carving knife, which he used in his sculptures.

From 19 January to 5 March 1978, he took part in the exhibition "Les Singuliers de l'art" at the Musée d'Art Moderne de Paris. In 1985, he was present at the festival "Octobre des arts" at Lyon–Saint-Exupéry Airport. In 2012 and 2013, he participated in the festival "Hors les normes" in Praz-sur-Arly. In 2020, he exhibited six of his works along hiking trails in the Belledonne mountain range. In June and July 2021, he held an exhibition at the Espace Aragon in Villard-Bonnot, organized by the Communauté de communes Le Grésivaudan.

The primary material for his sculptures was wood obtained from fallen trees, primarily elm, chestnut, oak, and ash. He also used polychrome and produced biodegradable outdoor sculptures. He carved his works typically with knives and chainsaws, giving the characters mouths and facial expressions. Jeanine Rivais of the Syndicat de la Critique Parisienne described Rosset as "a talented artist whose work extends and enriches the natural balance of the earth".

Rosset died on 3 December 2021, at the age of 84.

Public collections

Musée d'art contemporain de Lyon

Department of Aude
Commune of Saint-Quentin-Fallavier
Commune of Charny-Orée-de-Puisaye

References

1937 births
2021 deaths
20th-century French sculptors
21st-century French sculptors
People from Isère